Wong Man Ching is a Hongkonger former footballer who played as a forward. She has been a member of the Hong Kong women's national team.

International career 
Wong Man Ching capped for Hong Kong at senior level during the 2010 AFC Women's Asian Cup qualification.

See also 
 List of Hong Kong women's international footballers

References

External links 
 

Living people
Hong Kong women's footballers
Women's association football forwards
Hong Kong women's international footballers
Year of birth missing (living people)